Argentine Peak is a high mountain summit in the Front Range of the Rocky Mountains of North America. The summit lies on the Continental Divide between Clear Creek and Summit counties.

The peak is approximately 1 mile south of Argentine Pass.  The peak and the pass take their names from the Argentine District, Colorado's first major silver mining district.  Argentum is the Latin word for silver, for the silver ore found in the area.

Mountain

See also

List of Colorado mountain ranges
List of Colorado mountain summits
List of Colorado fourteeners
List of Colorado 4000 meter prominent summits
List of the most prominent summits of Colorado
List of Colorado county high points

References

External links

Argentine Peak on 13ers.com
Argentine Peak on listsofjohn.com
Argentine Peak on peakery.com
Argentine Peak on summitpost.org

Mountains of Colorado
Mountains of Clear Creek County, Colorado
Mountains of Summit County, Colorado
Arapaho National Forest
North American 4000 m summits
Great Divide of North America